Majboor is a 1974 Indian Hindi-language suspense thriller film directed by Ravi Tandon and written by Salim-Javed. The film stars an ensemble cast of Amitabh Bachchan, Parveen Babi, Pran, Satyen Kappu, Iftekhar, Jagdish Raj, Farida Jalal and Sulochana Latkar. The plot focuses on Ravi Khanna (Bachchan), a terminally ill man who frames himself for an unrelated murder so that his family can collect the reward money. 

The movie is loosely inspired by two English movies of 1970 – Zig zag and Cold Sweat. The film was later remade in Telugu by director K. Raghavendra Rao as Raja (1976) starring Shobhan Babu and Jayasudha.  It was also remade in Tamil as Naan Vazhavaippen (1979) with Sivaji Ganeshan and K. R. Vijaya, in Gujarati as Naseeb No Khel (1982) and in Malayalam as Ee Kaikalil (1986). The movie was also an inspiration for the 2008 movie Jimmy.

Plot 
Ravi Khanna (Amitabh Bachchan) is a middle-class travel agent who lives with his widowed mother (Sulochana Latkar), wheelchair-bound sister Renu (Farida Jalal) and younger brother Billu (Alankar Joshi), and is also in a relationship with his girlfriend Neela Rajvansh (Parveen Babi). One rainy night, Ravi deals with his wealthy client Surendra Sinha (Rehman) and accepts a lift from his car. Surendra is proceeded to be mysteriously abducted and is later found dead by the police in a gutter. This leads the two murder investigators CID Inspector Khurana (Iftekhar) and Inspector Kulkarni (Jagdish Raj) to interrogate Ravi at his office. Their keen interest in Ravi makes him nervous as he is the last known person to have seen Surendra.  

Around the same time, Ravi's  regular attacks of headache, seemingly triggered by stress, is diagnosed as the terminal illness of brain tumour, which needs to be extracted immediately through a brain surgery. However, Ravi is unintentionally scared by his examiner Dr. Shah (Sajjan) with the range of possible outcomes of either paralysis or blindness, or mental disability. This shocking revelation puts Ravi in a dilemma while he is deeply concerned about his family and Neela's future. 

While aware of the fact that his brain tumour is set to consume him in six months, Ravi learns from the daily newspaper that Surendra's younger brother Narendra Sinha (Satyen Kappu) has announced a reward of ₹500,000 for the capture of his brother's killer. This news conspires Ravi to anonymously contacts Inspector Khurana and names "himself" in tip as the murderer of Surendra, while he instructs the police to send Narendra's reward money to the office of his solicitor Advocate Rane (Shiv Kumar). 

On the other hand, Ravi sends an anonymous letter and a sealed envelope to Rane's office, instructing him to hand over the reward money to the person whose name is given in the envelope (having written his own mother's name in the envelope). With the help of the evidences manipulated by Ravi and fingerprinting, Khurana and Kulkarni become sure of his deception and arrest him. During the trial, Ravi makes a fake confession of abducting Surendra and killing him with an iron rod (which is also a part of the unreal evidences).

On the basis of reasonable doubt, the court announces a verdict of death sentence to Ravi, much to his family and Neela's devastation. Ravi's mother visits Narendra and begs him to withdraw Ravi's death penalty but in vain. Despite this, things take a fortunate turn when Ravi's yet another headache attack in prison lands him up at the hospital under police custody. While there, Ravi miraculously undergoes a successful brain surgery with no negative outcomes. However, it is too late now as Ravi is already a convicted criminal for abduction, ransom and murder. 

Well aware of having condemned himself to be hung for a murder he did not commit, Ravi reveals his suicidal conspiracy to Neela and Rane, who make him realise that the only way out to escape the consequences of his ill-advised actions is to find Surendra's real murderer. Seeing no other way out, Ravi hesitantly escapes from the hospital and sets out to search for the real culprit along with Neela. During his mission, Ravi investigates a significant ring that could lead him back to the killer and runs into Michael D'Souza (Pran), a kind-hearted and happy-go-lucky thief.

After learning of Ravi's plight, Michael pledges to help him nab the real culprit as he had robbed the same ring from the driver of a car on a rainy night, unmindful of the fact that it belonged to the dead Surendra at the backseat. Michael's endeavour to identify the murderer eventually takes him to Surendra's house. While there, he runs into the real killer and sets up the meeting point of an abandoned ramshackle wooden house at the riverside on the Kasara Ghat to settle the issue. Who could have been the actual murderer of Surendra and how would he have been exposed in the climax?

Cast 
 Amitabh Bachchan as Ravi Khanna
 Parveen Babi as Neela Rajvansh
 Pran as Michael D'Souza 
 Satyen Kappu as Narendra Sinha
 Iftekhar as CID Inspector Khurana (murder investigator) 
 Jagdish Raj as Inspector Kulkarni (murder investigator) 
 Farida Jalal as Renu Khanna (Ravi's sister) 
 Sulochana Latkar as Mrs. Khanna (Ravi's mother) 
 Rehman as Surendra Sinha (murder victim and Narendra's brother) 
 Mac Mohan as Prakash (Michael's friend) 
 Madan Puri as Mahipat Rai (Ravi's one-time acquaintance) 
 Alankar Joshi as Billu Khanna (Ravi's brother)  
 D.K. Sapru as Mr. Rajvansh (Neela's father) 
 Shiv Kumar as Advocate Rane (Ravi's friend) 
 Ashoo as Mona Sinha (Surendra's widow) 
 Sajjan as Dr. Shah (Ravi's examiner)
 Sudhir as Ravi's co-worker

Special Appearances 
 Lalita Kumari as Sulakshana Rai (Mahipat's wife) 
 Pinchoo Kapoor as the doctor brought by Ravi for Michael's treatment 
 Jayashree Talpade as Michael's girlfriend in "Daroo Ki Botal" song

Soundtrack

Success
The film was a Hit at the box office.

Awards and nominations
23rd Filmfare Awards:

Nominated

 Best Supporting Actor – Pran
 Best Supporting Actress – Farida Jalal

References

External links
 

1974 films
1970s Hindi-language films
Films scored by Laxmikant–Pyarelal
Hindi films remade in other languages
Films with screenplays by Salim–Javed
1970s Urdu-language films
Urdu films remade in other languages
Indian remakes of American films
Indian films about cancer
Fratricide in fiction
Films directed by Ravi Tandon
Urdu-language Indian films